Jared Elliott is the head coach of the Western Illinois Leathernecks football team

Jared Elliott may also refer to:

Jared Elliott, actor who appeared on Next Action Star
Jared Elliott, chaplain of vessel that explored Elliott Bay during the Wilkes Expedition